Miluše is a female given name. The name is an Old Czech variant of Milota. Milena is a Czech nickname for Miloslava meaning dear, darling. It is pronounced MIL-uw-sheh.

Name Days 
Czech: 3 August

Name variants 
 Miluša (Slovak)

Famous bearers 
 Miluše Šplechtová, Czech actress
 Miluška Voborníková, Czech actress

Czech feminine given names
Slovak feminine given names